Berthold Hoeckner is a German musicologist who serves as the J. W. Van Gorkom Professor and Department Chair of Music at the University of Notre Dame. He was educated at the Musikhochschule Cologne, University of Cologne, and King's College London before earning his doctorate from Cornell University in 1994. Hoeckner grew up in Olpe, Germany.

Hoeckner specializes in nineteenth- and twentieth-century music, aesthetics, Theodor Adorno, music and literature, film music and visual culture, and the psychology and neuroscience of music. Hoeckner has received numerous awards and fellowships, including the Alfred Einstein Prize from the American Musicological Society in 1998, a Mellon New Directions Fellowship from the Andrew Mellon Foundation in 2006-2007, and a research fellowship from the Alexander von Humboldt Foundation in 2001-2002. He has been at the University of Chicago since 1994, and also serves as resource faculty for the Cinema and Media Studies Department, and Germanic Studies Department, and on the faculty of the Scherer Center for the Study of American Culture.

Books and Selected Articles
 Film, Music, Memory (University of Chicago Press 2019)
 “Audiovisual Memory: Transport and Transportation.” In Beyond the Soundtrack: Representing Music in Cinema (Richard Leppert, Lawrence Kramer, and Daniel Goldmark, Editors - University of California Press 2007)
 “Paths through Dichterliebe.” Nineteenth-Century Music (2006)
 Apparitions: New Perspectives on Adorno and Twentieth-Century Music (Editor - Routledge 2006)
 “Homage to Adorno's ‘Homage to Zerlina’.” Musical Quarterly (2004)
 Programming the Absolute: Nineteenth-Century German Music and the Hermeneutics of the Moment (Princeton University Press 2002)
 “Poet's Love and Composer's Love.” Music Theory Online (2001)
 “Schumann and Romantic Distance.” Journal of the American Musicological Society (1997)
 "Elsa Screams or the Birth of Music Drama.” Cambridge Opera Journal (1997)

References

Living people
University of Chicago faculty
Cornell University alumni
German musicologists
Alumni of King's College London
Hochschule für Musik und Tanz Köln alumni
Year of birth missing (living people)